The line formation is a standard tactical formation which was used in early modern warfare.
It continued the phalanx formation or shield wall of infantry armed with polearms in use during antiquity and the Middle Ages.

The line formation provided the best frontage for volley fire, while sacrificing maneuverability and defence against cavalry. It came to the fore during the Age of Reason, when it was used to great effect by Frederick the Great and his enemies during the Seven Years' War. The line formation was very successfully first used with combined arms in the Thirty Years War by the Swedish 
king Gustavus Adolphus the Great, at the Battle of Breitenfeld.

An infantry battalion would form "in line" by placing troops in several ranks, ranging in number from two to five, with three ranks being the most common arrangement. Each rank was approximately half a metre apart from the next, and soldiers in a rank were positioned closely to each other (usually within arm's length), with just enough room to present their weapons, fire, and reload. The line formation required that the troops be well-drilled and constantly supervised by officers and non-commissioned officers (NCOs).

In 17th- and 18th-century European armies, NCOs were positioned to the rear of the line. They were equipped with long polearms, which they used to "dress" or arrange the ranks, a practice which included pushing down the weapons of any soldier who was aiming too high, as well as ensuring that the rank remained well-organized and correctly placed. Movement in line formation was very slow, and unless the battalion was superbly trained, a breakdown in cohesion was virtually assured, especially in any kind of uneven or wooded terrain. As a result, line was mostly used as a stationary formation, with troops moving in columns and then deploying to line at their destination.

In addition, the line formation was extremely vulnerable to cavalry charges, from the flanks and rear, and these attacks usually resulted in the complete breakdown of cohesion and even destruction of the unit unless it was able to "form square".

During the Napoleonic Wars, the British Army famously adopted a thin two-rank line formation. This was adopted to compensate for their lack of numbers and to maximize their fire frontage. The British continued to use a two-rank line until the late 19th century. The famous "Thin Red Line" of the 93rd (Highland) Regiment at the Battle of Balaklava successfully held against a Russian cavalry attack, a rare occurrence.

A loose line formation called a skirmish line is used by many modern forces during assaults as it enables maximum firepower to be directed in one direction at once, useful when attacking an enemy position. It also enables the use of fire and movement.

The line formation and cavalry 

The line formation was also used by certain types of cavalry.

The Sassanid Persians, the Mamluks, and Muslim cavalry in India often used the tactics named "shower shooting".  It involved a line of fairly well-armoured cavalrymen (often on armoured horses) standing in a massed static line or advancing in an ordered formation at the walk while loosing their arrows as quickly as possible by reducing their draw length.

In the 16th century, the heavy cavalry (gendarmes, reiters and cuirassiers) often attacked in a line formation. Later, dragoons began to use linear tactics, being on foot in the defence. Accordingly, the name "line cavalry" has moved from heavy cavalry to the dragoons. Hussars in the 15th-17th centuries wore armor, and often attacked in close line formation, but later hussars became a light cavalry and stopped using linear tactics. Cossacks never used linear tactics.

See also 

 Line of battle
 Column (formation)
 Mixed order
 Flying wedge
 Svinfylking

References 

Line
Tactical formations of the Napoleonic Wars